Grote Prijs Stad Sint-Niklaas is a cycling race held annually in Sint-Niklaas, Belgium since 1932. In 2016 and 2017, it was a category 1.2 event on the UCI Europe Tour.

Winners

References

Cycle races in Belgium
UCI Europe Tour races
Recurring sporting events established in 1932
1932 establishments in Belgium